The Wages of Sin is a BBC Books original novel written by David A. McIntee and based on the long-running British science fiction television series Doctor Who. It features the Third Doctor, Liz Shaw and Jo Grant.  The events of the novel apparently take place immediately following The Three Doctors.

It is noteworthy for depicting the Doctor's first test flight of the TARDIS following the restoration of his time-travelling abilities. It also shows Liz's first trip in the TARDIS, since the Doctor was unable to work the ship during her time with him as a companion.

During the story, the Doctor, Jo and Liz meet Rasputin.

References

External links

The Cloister Library - The Wages of Sin

1999 British novels
1999 science fiction novels
Past Doctor Adventures
Third Doctor novels
Novels by David A. McIntee